Wilson Creek, Wilson's Creek or Wilsons Creek may refer to:

In Australia:
Wilsons Creek (New South Wales)
Wilson Creek (Northern Territory)
Wilson Creek (Tasmania)
Wilson Creek (Victoria)
Wilson Creek (Western Australia)

In Canada:
Wilson Creek (Siocan), a creek feeding Slocan Lake, British Columbia
Wilson Creek, British Columbia, a community in Sechelt on the Sunshine Coast, British Columbia

In the United States:
Wilson Creek (Humboldt County), California
Wilson Creek (Temecula Creek tributary), a stream in Riverside County, California
Wilson Creek (Ohio River tributary), a stream in Indiana
Wilsons Creek (Missouri), a waterway near Springfield, Missouri
Battle of Wilson's Creek, an American Civil War Battle
Wilson's Creek National Battlefield
Wilson Creek (Nevada)
Wilson Creek (North Carolina)
Wilson Creek (Trent River tributary), a stream in Craven County, North Carolina
Wilson Creek (Johnson County, Texas)
Wilson Creek (Clinton County, Ohio)
Wilson Creek (Lackawanna River)
Wilson Creek, Washington, a town in Grant County
Wilson Creek (Wisconsin), a stream in Sauk County

See also